Eupithecia lachrymosa is a moth in the family Geometridae first described by George Duryea Hulst in 1900. It is found in North America from central Saskatchewan west to southern Vancouver Island, north to British Columbia and Alberta and south to California.

The wingspan is 19–24 mm. Adults are dark grey brown with obscure markings, except for a fairly prominent dark forewing discal dot.

The larvae feed on Betula papyrifera, Salix, Ceanothus, and Alnus species.

References

Moths described in 1900
lachrymosa
Moths of North America